Tobias Kamke was the defending champion but decided not to participate.
Ivo Karlović won the tournament after defeating Sam Querrey 6–7(2–7), 6–1, 6–4 in the final.

Seeds

Draw

Finals

Top half

Bottom half

References
 Main draw
 Qualifying draw

2011 ATP Challenger Tour
2011 Singles